The straight-billed earthcreeper (Ochetorhynchus ruficaudus) is a species of bird in the family Furnariidae. It is found in Argentina, Bolivia, Chile, and Peru. Its natural habitat is subtropical or tropical high-altitude shrubland.

Description
The upper parts are pale brown with rufous colour on some of the flight feathers. The tail is rufous brown, with blackish inner webs to the central feathers, and is often kept cocked at a marked angle. The throat and chest are white and the breast and belly are pale brown, with white streaks. The beak is long and straight, and there is a narrow white supercilium above the eye.

Distribution and habitat
This species occurs in the foothills of the Andes Mountains, its range extending from southern Peru and the La Paz Department in western Bolivia to northern Argentina and the eastern fringes of Chile.

Ecology
The straight-billed earthcreeper usually occurs in pairs or singly but is rather elusive, hopping about on the ground among boulders and in rocky areas. The song, often uttered from the ground, is a loud series of notes that first rises in pitch and then slowly descends and fades away.

Status
The straight-billed earthcreeper has a very wide range in Bolivia, southern Peru, northern and central Chile and northwestern Argentina. It is a fairly common bird and despite the fact that the population appears to be declining, this is not happening at such a fast rate as to make it vulnerable, and the International Union for Conservation of Nature has assessed its conservation status as being of least concern.

References

 SACC (2007). Reinstate Ochetorhynchus and merge Chilia and Eremobius into it. Accessed 2008-10-28.

straight-billed earthcreeper
Birds of Argentina
Birds of the Puna grassland
Birds of the Southern Andes
straight-billed earthcreeper
Taxonomy articles created by Polbot